Traralgon College is a dual-campus government-funded co-educational secondary day school, located in Traralgon, Gippsland, Victoria, Australia.

Traralgon College serves 1,200 students with two campuses. The east campus is the Junior Campus (Year 7 to Year 8) and the West Campus (Year 9 to Year 12) is for Senior students. The school has partnerships with several other universities and colleges locally and overseas.

History
The college lost its camp and some buildings in the East Campus in four fires suffered in 2006.

Junior Campus (East Campus) 
This campus consists of students in the year level 7 to 9 and started to offer the Hands on Learning program in 2009.

Senior Campus (West Campus) 
The West Campus consists of VCE and VCAL in the year levels 10–12.

See also

 List of high schools in Victoria

References

Public high schools in Victoria (Australia)
Traralgon